Jean Duprat (12 November 1936, Lannemezan – 26 April 2018) was a French politician.

He was a member of the Radical Party of the Left and began his political career as a member of the Tarbes municipal council serving from 1977 to 2001. In 1981, Duprat was named to the National Assembly in place of François Abadie. He served until 1986, and was later elected to the Barbazan-Dessus municipal council, between 2001 and 2014.

References

1936 births
2018 deaths
People from Hautes-Pyrénées
Politicians from Occitania (administrative region)
Radical Party of the Left politicians
Deputies of the 7th National Assembly of the French Fifth Republic